The Hiram C. Smith House is a historic residence located west of Winterset, Iowa, United States.  Smith was one of the earliest settlers in this township, having acquired the deed to the  farm between 1854 and 1856. This house is an early example of a vernacular limestone farmhouse.  It is a 1½-story, one-room structure composed of rubble stone quarried on the farm and laid in a random bond.  Its construction is attributed to Smith, as its rough and simple construction do not reflect the work of any of the stonemasons working in the county at the time it was built.  The house was listed on the National Register of Historic Places in 1987.  His milking shed, built about the same time and on the same property, is also listed on the National Register.

References

Houses completed in 1856
Vernacular architecture in Iowa
Houses in Madison County, Iowa
National Register of Historic Places in Madison County, Iowa
Houses on the National Register of Historic Places in Iowa